The 2016 Porsche Carrera Cup Australia was an Australian motor racing series open to Porsche 911 GT3 Cup cars. It was sanctioned by the Confederation of Australian Motor Sport (CAMS) as a National Series with Porsche Cars Australia Pty Ltd appointed as the Category Manager. It was the 12th Carrera Cup to be contested in Australia and the first to be sanctioned as a national series rather than a national championship.

The series was won by Matt Campbell.

Teams and drivers

The following teams and drivers contested the series.

All vehicles were Porsche 911 GT3 Cup Type 991 cars.

Race calendar
The championship was contested over eight rounds.

Series standings 
The series was won by Matt Campbell.

The following table reflects the series standings as at the completion of the season.

References

External links
 

Australian Carrera Cup Championship seasons
Porsche Carrera Cup Australia